Nicholas Van Dyke may refer to:

 Nicholas Van Dyke (politician, born 1738) (1738–1789), American lawyer and Governor of Delaware, father of the U.S. Senator
 Nicholas Van Dyke (politician, born 1769) (1770–1826), American lawyer and U.S. Senator from Delaware, son of the Governor